Fratrum nay refer to:

Batis fratrum, a species of bird in the family Platysteiridae. 
Toller Fratrum, a very small village in West Dorset, England.
Unitas Fratrum, the original name for the organisation that became the Moravian Church.